Greenaway is a surname. Notable people with the surname include:

David Greenaway (1889–1946), Scottish footballer
David Greenaway (economist) (born 1952), professor of economics at the University of Nottingham
Emerson Greenaway (1906-1990), American librarian
Frank Greenaway (1917–2013), English chemist and writer
Gavin Greenaway (born 1964), music composer and conductor, son of Roger Greenaway
Joseph A. Greenaway, Jr. (born 1957), United States judge
Kate Greenaway (1846–1901), children's book illustrator and writer
Lorne Greenaway (born 1933), Progressive Conservative party member of the Canadian House of Commons
Peter Greenaway (born 1942), Welsh-born English film director
Peter Van Greenaway (1929–1988), British novelist
Roger Greenaway (born 1938), popular English songwriter
Sally Greenaway (born 1984), Australian composer and pianist

Fictional
Elle Greenaway, a former protagonist of American television crime drama series Criminal Minds

See also
Greenway (disambiguation)
The Greenaway baronets, a title in the Baronetage of the United Kingdom
The Kate Greenaway Medal, a prize to an outstanding work of illustration in children's literature